Giancarlo Ferrari (born 22 October 1942) is a retired Italian archer. He competed in five consecutive Olympics from 1972 to 1988 and won individual bronze medals in 1976 and 1980. At the world championships he earner a team silver in 1977.

References

1942 births
Living people
People from Abbiategrasso
Italian male archers
Olympic archers of Italy
Sportspeople from the Metropolitan City of Milan
Archers at the 1972 Summer Olympics
Archers at the 1976 Summer Olympics
Archers at the 1980 Summer Olympics
Archers at the 1984 Summer Olympics
Archers at the 1988 Summer Olympics
Olympic bronze medalists for Italy
Olympic medalists in archery
Medalists at the 1980 Summer Olympics
Medalists at the 1976 Summer Olympics
World Archery Championships medalists
20th-century Italian people